Beau Riffenburgh (born 1955) is an author and historian specializing in polar exploration. He is also an American football coach and author of books on football history.

Early career 
A native of California, Riffenburgh was the Senior Writer and Director of Research for National Football League Properties in the eighties and early nineties. While there, he wrote or edited seven books, including the NFL's official encyclopedia. He served briefly as Editor-in-Chief for Total Sports Publishing.

Polar research 
Riffenburgh earned his doctorate degree at the Scott Polar Research Institute at the University of Cambridge. He has written or edited numerous books on polar exploration, including The Myth of the Explorer, a scholarly examination of the relationship of the popular press with exploration; Shackleton's Forgotten Expedition, the story of Ernest Shackleton's Nimrod Expedition, which almost attained both the South Pole and the South Magnetic Pole; and Racing with Death, the story of Douglas Mawson's Antarctic expeditions. He was the editor of the Encyclopedia of the Antarctic, a two-volume work that is the most comprehensive reference work ever produced about the Antarctic.

From 1992 to 2005, Riffenburgh served as the editor of Polar Record, the world's oldest journal of polar research. He has served as the head of the Polar History Group at the Scott Polar Research Institute and as a lecturer in the history faculty of the University of Cambridge.

Coaching career 
While at Cambridge he put his expertise in American football to use as the head coach of Cambridge's team in the British Collegiate American Football League. He was named National Coach of the Year twice in his five seasons (1991–1996). After Cambridge dropped their team, Riffenburgh spent one season as head coach of the University of Hertfordshire Hurricanes. The team went undefeated and won the National Championship during the 1997–1998 season, and he was again named National Coach of the Year. 

Riffenburgh was the first head coach of the Great Britain Bulldogs, the national university American football team, which won the first two European Championships in 1994 and 1996.

He was inducted into the BCAFL's Hall of Fame in 2000 as part of the Hall's founding class.

Detective novels
Riffenburgh writes detective novels with his wife, Liz Cruwys, under the pseudonym Simon Beaufort.

Partial bibliography

Books on exploration 
 Encyclopedia of the Antarctic (2006)
 Shackleton's Forgotten Expedition : The Voyage of the Nimrod (2005)
 Nimrod: Ernest Shackleton and the Extraordinary Story of the 1907–09 British Antarctic Expedition (2005)
 With Scott to the Pole: The Photographs of Herbert Ponting. (1998, with Elizabeth Cruwys)
 The Myth of the Explorer : The Press, Sensationalism, and Geographical Discovery (1994)

Books on football 
 20th Century Sports : Images of Greatness (1999, with Mike Meserole)
 The American Football Almanac (1992)
 NFL : Official History of Pro Football (1990)
 Great Ones: NFL Quarterbacks from Montana to Baugh (1989)
 Official NFL Encyclopedia (1986)
 Running Wild: A Pictorial Tribute to the NFL's Greatest runners (1984)

Mystery 
 The Watchers of the Dead (2019)
 Mind of A Killer (2017)
 The Coiners' Quarrel (2017)
 The King's Spies (2017)
 The Bishop's Brood (2016)
 The Killing Ship (2016)
 A Head for Poisoning (2015)
 Murder in the Holy City (2014)
 The Murder House (2013)
 Deadly Inheritance (2011)
 A Dead Man's Secret (2010)
 The Bloodstained Throne (2010)

References

External links 
 Riffenburgh bio from publisher
 Riffenburgh's Entry at BCAFL Hall of Fame

Living people
1955 births
Exploration of Antarctica
History of the Arctic
Alumni of the University of Cambridge
American male writers
People of the Scott Polar Research Institute